Khanpur Dhadda is a village in the Nakodar tehsil of Jalandhar district in Punjab, India. The village is administrated by a sarpanch who is an elected representative of village as per Panchayati Raj.

Transport 
Nakodar railway station is the nearest train station.

References 

Villages in Jalandhar district
Villages in Nakodar tehsil